Bungo may refer to:

Places
 Bungo, Angola, a town in Uíge Province, Angola.
 Bungo, Luanda, a borough (bairro) of Luanda, Angola
 Bungo Channel or Bungo Strait, between the Japanese islands of Kyushu and Shikoku
 Bungo Province of ancient Japan
 Bungo Suidō Prefectural Natural Park on the shore of Bungo Channel
 Bungo Regency, a regency in Jambi Province, Indonesia
 Bungo Township, Cass County, Minnesota
 Muara Bungo, a city in Jambi Province, Indonesia
 Lungué Bungo River or Lungwebungu River, in Angola and Zambia, tributary of the Zambesi
 Strathbungo, an old village in Scotland, now engulfed by Glasgow

People and characters
 Bungo Fukusaki (1959–), professional shogi player
 Bungo Shirai (1928–), president of the Chunichi Shimbun and owner of the Chunichi Dragons
 Bungo Tsuda (1918–2007), Japanese politician
 Bungo Yoshida (1934–2008), Japanese puppeteer, modernizer of bunraku
 Bungo, a character in the Wombles novels by Elisabeth Beresford

Other
 Bungo (fruit) (Saba comorensis), a fruit from Tanzania
 Bungo (Japanese language), the literary Japanese language

 JDS Bungo (MST-464), a ship of the Japanese navy
 PS Bungo or Persibut Bungo, an Indonesian soccer team
 Bungo Stray Dogs,  a Japanese manga series by Kafka Asagiri and Sango Harukawa

See also
 Bongo (disambiguation)